Oldcastle is a small village in Monmouthshire, south east Wales.

Location

Oldcastle is located six miles north of Abergavenny just off the A465 Abergavenny to Hereford road.

History and amenities

The village is on the River Monnow and very close to the Black Mountains and sits right next to the Wales-England border  .

The village is associated with John Oldcastle of an old Herefordshire landowning family through the medieval period.

External links
Oldcastle on Vision of Britain
Oldcastle church
The church entrance

Villages in Monmouthshire